William Draper Byrne (born September 26, 1964) is an American prelate of the Roman Catholic Church. He has been serving as the bishop of the Diocese of Springfield in Massachusetts since 2020.

Biography

Early life 
William Byrne was born on September 26, 1964, in Washington, D.C., the son of Mary and William Draper Byrne, a surgeon. William Byrne grew up in McLean, Virginia, and attended the Mater Dei School in Bethesda, Maryland  Starting in the ninth grade, Byrne attended Georgetown Preparatory School in Rockville, Maryland.

Byrne completed his undergraduate studies at the College of the Holy Cross in Worcester, Massachusetts. According to Byrne's older sister, Dede Byrne, he was influenced in college to become a priest by the example of their uncle, John Byrne, a priest in New York City.

While a seminarian, Byrne studied at the Pontifical North American College in Rome. He received a Bachelor of Sacred Theology in 1992 and a Licentiate of Sacred Theology in 1994 from the Pontifical University of Saint Thomas Aquinas.

Priesthood 
Byrne was ordained to the priesthood for the Archdiocese of Washington on June 25, 1994 by Archbishop James Hickey.

Byrne served as parochial vicar at Little Flower Parish in Bethesda from 1994 to 1995 and then as parochial vicar at Shrine of Saint Jude Parish in Rockville. He then served as chaplain for the University of Maryland's Catholic Student Center in College Park, Maryland, from 1999 until 2007. 

From 2007 to 2015, Byrne was pastor of St. Peter's Parish in Washington, DC. While in that position he began a special ministry to Catholic members of the United States Congress. From 2009 to 2015, Byrne was also secretary for pastoral ministry and social concerns for the archdiocese. He served as pastor of Our Lady of Mercy Parish in Potomac, Maryland, from 2015 to 2020.Before his appointment as bishop, Byrne had gained national attention for his writings and YouTube videos.

Bishop of Springfield in Massachusetts 
Pope Francis named Byrne as bishop of the Diocese of Springfield in Massachusetts on October 14, 2020. He received his episcopal consecration at St. Michael's Cathedral in Springfield on December 14, 2020, from Cardinal Sean O'Malley.

In May 2021, Byrne released an expanded list of priests within the diocese who faced credible accusations of sexual abuse. He said:As a Church, both locally and universally, too many times in the past we have failed to protect the innocence and dignity of minors from those who committed these heinous crimes.  We can never erase the harm done, however, acknowledging a survivor’s allegations to be credible brings the truth of their horrific experience into the light. I offer my most sincere apology to all who have suffered from the abuse and to their loved ones. I am truly sorry.

See also

 Catholic Church hierarchy
 Catholic Church in the United States
 Historical list of the Catholic bishops of the United States
 List of Catholic bishops of the United States
 Lists of patriarchs, archbishops, and bishops

References

External links
 "Five Things with Fr. Byrne" on the Archdiocese of Washington YouTube channel
Roman Catholic Docese of Springfield in Massachusetts Official Site 
Roman Catholic Archdiocese of Washington Official Site

Episcopal succession

  
 

1964 births
Living people
Roman Catholic Diocese of Springfield in Massachusetts
Roman Catholic bishops of Springfield in Massachusetts
Roman Catholic Archdiocese of Washington
Catholic Church in Maryland
Religious leaders from Washington, D.C.
College of the Holy Cross alumni
Pontifical North American College alumni
Pontifical University of Saint Thomas Aquinas alumni
21st-century Roman Catholic bishops in the United States
Bishops appointed by Pope Francis